James Toner (23 August 1924 – 31 March 2016) was a Scottish footballer, who played for Dundee and Leeds United. He won two Scottish League Cup winner's medals with Dundee.

He was seriously injured in a coach crash on the M25 motorway near London on 4 January 2007 in which his wife Christina was killed.

References

External links
 

1924 births
2016 deaths
Dundee F.C. players
Association football wingers
Leeds United F.C. players
Scottish Football League players
Scottish footballers
English Football League players
Motherwell F.C. players
Forfar Athletic F.C. players
Fauldhouse United F.C. players
Footballers from Glasgow
Scottish Junior Football Association players